Indirana chiravasi (common name: Amboli leaping frog) is a species of frog endemic to the Western Ghats of India. It is only known from its type locality, the laterite plateaus by the hill-station of Amboli, Maharashtra. It was described in 2014 by a team of three scientists from IISER, Pune and MES Abasaheb Garware College.

Description
Males measure  and females  in snout–vent length. The skin is smooth except on the sides that are granular; there are few longitudinal folds on dorsal side. Dorsal colour is olive brown with scattered yellow markings and, in males only, densely organized black spots comprising a W-shaped
marking. There is a black strip running from tip of snout to shoulder through eye and tympanum. The fingers are unwebbed whereas the toes are moderately webbed.

Habitat
Indirana chiravasi inhabit lateritic rocky outcrops and occur in a variety of microhabitats. They are often found in the crevices of the laterite boulders; males are mostly seen while calling from the wet rocks or moss-covered boulders. Females have been found under a log in the forest and from under a roadside stone. The tadpoles are terrestrial and have been observed feeding on algal matter on wet boulders.

References

chiravasi
Endemic fauna of the Western Ghats
Frogs of India
Amphibians described in 2014